The Ohio Shale is a geologic formation in Ohio. It preserves fossils dating back to the Devonian period.

See also

 List of fossiliferous stratigraphic units in Ohio

References
 

Shale formations of the United States
Oil shale in the United States
Oil shale formations
Devonian Ohio
Devonian Kentucky
Devonian geology of Tennessee
Devonian geology of Virginia
Geologic formations of Ohio
Devonian System of North America